Rhizoplaca polymorpha is a species of crustose lichen in the  family Lecanoraceae.

References

Further reading
Yazici, Kenan, and Ali Aslan. "Comparison of Trace Element Levels of Lichen Species Living on Different Habitats." Asian Journal of Chemistry 24.2 (2012): 920.
Renner, Susanne S. "A return to Linnaeus's focus on diagnosis, not description: The use of DNA characters in the formal naming of species."Systematic biology (2016): syw032.

Lecanoraceae
Lichen species
Lichens described in 2013
Taxa named by Helge Thorsten Lumbsch